Father José Luis Arroyave Restrepo Library, most commonly known as San Javier Library (Spanish: Parque Biblioteca San Javier) for its location in the San Javier commune, is one of ten library parks in Medellín, Colombia. The library was designed by architect Javier Vera.

History

A hillside area south of the San Javier metro station was chosen as the site of the San Javier Library Park. It is located at the beginning of the San Cristobal Metro Cable.

Construction began on June 1, 2005.

References

External links
 Official Library Homepage (Spanish)

Libraries in Colombia
Buildings and structures in Medellín
Culture in Medellín
Libraries established in 2006
2006 establishments in Colombia